This article is one of a series providing information about endemism among birds in the world's various zoogeographic zones. For an overview of this subject see Endemism in birds.

This article covers western North America, i.e. the regions of the United States and Canada which lie west of the Great Plains.

Patterns of endemism
There are no families endemic to this region.

The following genera are endemic to the region:
 Dendragapus, the blue grouse (2 species)
 Chamaea, wrentit (1 species)

Endemic Bird Areas
Most bird species which are endemic to this region have ranges which are too large to qualify for BirdLife International's restricted-range endemic status. As a result, only one Endemic Bird Area has been defined, in California.

List of species
The following is a list of species endemic to this region:

 California condor
 California quail
 Gambel's quail
 Mountain quail
 Sooty grouse
 Dusky grouse
 Greater sage-grouse
 Gunnison grouse
 White-tailed ptarmigan
 Prairie falcon
 Black oystercatcher
 Black turnstone
 Surfbird
 Heermann's gull
 Spotted owl
 Flammulated owl
 Northern pygmy owl
 Anna's hummingbird
 Lewis's woodpecker
 Williamson's sapsucker
 Red-breasted sapsucker
 Red-naped sapsucker
 Nuttall's woodpecker
 White-headed woodpecker
 Gray vireo
 Pinyon jay
 California scrub jay
 Santa Cruz Island scrub jay
 Yellow-billed magpie
 Northwestern crow
 Oak titmouse
 Juniper titmouse
 Mountain chickadee
 Chestnut-backed chickadee
 Pacific wren
 Wrentit
 Mountain bluebird
 Varied thrush
 Sage thrasher
 California thrasher
 Bendire's thrasher
 Le Conte's thrasher
 McKay's bunting
 Green-tailed towhee
 California towhee
 Abert's towhee
 Rufous-winged sparrow
 Brewer's sparrow
 Bell's sparrow
 Sagebrush sparrow
 Golden-crowned sparrow
 Tri-colored blackbird
 Gray-crowned rosy finch
 Brown-capped rosy finch
 Black rosy finch
 Cassin's finch
 Lawrence's goldfinch

In addition, the following are endemic as breeding species:

 Fork-tailed storm-petrel
 Whooping crane
 Mountain plover
 Bristle-thighed curlew
 Long-billed curlew
 Aleutian tern
 Hammond's flycatcher
 Gray flycatcher
 Dusky flycatcher
 Cassin's vireo
 Virginia's warbler
 Lucy's warbler
 Black-throated gray warbler
 Hermit warbler
 Townsend's warbler
 MacGillivray's warbler
 Western tanager
 Lazuli bunting
 Bullock's oriole

The following species are near-endemic:

 Red-faced cormorant
 Pelagic cormorant
 Brandt's cormorant
 Trumpeter swan
 Cinnamon teal
 Glaucous-winged gull ? (12% of the population winters in Asia)
 Western gull
 Western screech owl
 Common poorwill

The following species spend the winter wholly within the region:

 Western grebe ?
 Clark's grebe ?

Lists of birds of North America
E
North America